Mohammad Mohammadian (Persian: محمد محمدیان; ; born 22 June 1987) is an Iranian film director, screenwriter, photographer and producer. He became interested in cinema in his teenage years, and started his filmmaking education with the Iranian filmmaker Abbas Kiarostami, whose cinematic style has been a great influence on him.

Early life and background 
Mohammadian was born in Isfahan. Historically also rendered in English as Ispahan, Spahan, Sepahan, Esfahan or Hispahan, is a major city in Iran, Greater Isfahan Region. He is one of Abbas Kiarostami's students, and his first artistic experience was filmmaking. Mohammadian has been active as an independent filmmaker since 2016, and his cinematic inspiration is Abbas Kiarostami and Italian neorealism.

Filmography

Awards and nominations

See also 
Agnès Varda
Abbas Kiarostami
Experimental film

References

External links 

 

 

1987 births
Living people
Persian-language film directors
Film people from Isfahan
Iranian documentary film directors
Iranian screenwriters
21st-century photographers
Iranian photographers
Iranian documentary film producers
21st-century screenwriters
Iranian experimental filmmakers
Silent film directors
English-language film directors
French-language film directors